Carposina berberidella is a moth of the Carposinidae family. It is found from Spain, Italy, Germany, Austria, Poland, the Czech Republic, Slovakia, former Yugoslavia and the European part of Russia to the Middle East.

The wingspan is about 14.5 mm. The forewings are brown-gray and the hindwings darkened.

The larvae feed on Berberis species. They feed inside the fruit of their host plant.

References

Moths described in 1853
Carposinidae
Moths of Europe
Moths of Asia